The wind resource potential in NSW is very good, yet this potential has remained largely untapped. The NSW Wind Atlas shows that many of the sites with good potential for wind farms are situated on the western side of the Great Dividing Range. While the wind is also strong in coastal areas, wind farms are unlikely to be built there due to existing residential development and national park areas. NSW also has an extensive electricity transmission network, providing relatively good power grid access for new wind farms.
  
As of March 2015, there was 625 MW of wind power installed in NSW. As of May 2019, there was 1493 MW of wind power installed in NSW.

To measure public attitudes to wind farms, the NSW government surveyed 2000 people and 300 businesses in rural NSW in late 2010. About 80 per cent of respondents said they would strongly support wind farms in their region. Support dropped off somewhat if a wind farm was proposed closer to a person's house but 60 per cent still supported wind turbines within two kilometres of their house. About 13 per cent of people surveyed, many aged over 65, said they did not support wind power.

Wind farms in New South Wales 

A list of operating and planned wind farms in New South Wales is below.

See also 

 List of power stations in New South Wales
 Wind power in Australia

References

External links 
Wind farms in New South Wales: Wind in the Bush

 
New South Wales
Wind farms
Articles containing video clips